Robert Aron Emilsson (born 20 February 1990) is a Swedish politician and member of the Riksdag for the Sweden Democrats party. He represents the  Östergötland County constituency. He also serves as the SD's spokesman on foreign policy.

In parliament he has sat on the Social Affairs Committee, the Foreign Affairs committee and the Committee on Culture. Since 2022, he has also served as chairman of the  Committee on Foreign Affairs.

Biography 
Emilsson studied for a bachelor's degree and then a PhD in philosophy, cultural heritage studies and politics at the University of Gothenburg.
 
He was elected to the Riksdag during the 2014 Swedish general election.

Member of Parliament 
In 2014, he was elected to Sweden's Riksdag, where he was a member of the culture committee, a deputy in the environment and agriculture committee and a member of the Nordic Council's Swedish delegation. Since 20 October 2021, he is a member of the Foreign Affairs Committee.

References 

1990 births
Living people
University of Gothenburg alumni
Members of the Riksdag 2014–2018
Members of the Riksdag 2018–2022
Members of the Riksdag from the Sweden Democrats
Members of the Riksdag 2022–2026
21st-century Swedish politicians